Goat gland was a term applied , during the period of transition from silent films to sound films.  It referred to an already completed silent film to which one or more talkie sequences were added in an effort to make the otherwise redundant film more suitable for release in the radically altered market conditions. The name was derived by analogy from the treatment devised by Dr. John R. Brinkley as an alleged cure for impotence.

References
John Belton: 'Awkward Transitions: Hitchcock's "Blackmail" and the Dynamics of Early Film Sound' in The Musical Quarterly, Vol. 83, No. 2 (Summer 1999), pp. 227-246

1920s in film
History of film
Film sound production